Pearnel Charles (born 1936) is a Jamaican politician with the Jamaica Labour Party who was the Speaker of the House of Representatives.

Early life
Charles was born in 1936 in the parish of St. Ann. He attended Lime Tree Garden Elementary School, West Indies College and the City College of the University of New York where he was President of the West Indian Students' Association. He graduated from City College with a bachelor's degree in political science, after which he returned to Jamaica.

Career
Charles became vice-president of the Bustamante Industrial Trade Union. In 1969, he was appointed as a Parish Councillor in the Kingston and St. Andrew Corporation. From 1972 to 1980 he was a senator and an elected member of parliament representing Eastern St. Thomas. Charles was the deputy leader of the Jamaica Labour Party (JLP) from 1972 to 1991. In June 1976, after a state of emergency was declared by the People's National Party, Charles was detained by armed forces and brought to Kingston for questioning. In 2002, he successfully ran as a JLP candidate for North Central Clarendon. He served as the Minister of Labour and Social Security in Jamaica from 2007 to 2012. In March 2016, he was elected as Speaker of the House of Representatives.

Personal life
His daughter Patrece Charles-Freeman is a public health consultant, and also ran as the JLP candidate in East St Thomas in the 2011 election. His son Pearnel Patroe Charles Jr. serves the people of Jamaica as a Senator and the Minister of State in the Ministry of National Security.

References

Living people
Government ministers of Jamaica
Members of the House of Representatives of Jamaica
Jamaica Labour Party politicians
Speakers of the House of Representatives of Jamaica
1936 births